Oktyabrsky District is an administrative and municipal district (raion), one of the nine in Khanty-Mansi Autonomous Okrug of Tyumen Oblast, Russia. It is located in the western central part of the autonomous okrug. Its administrative center is the urban locality (an urban-type settlement) of Oktyabrskoye. As of the 2010 Census, the total population of the district was 32,224, with the population of Oktyabrskoye accounting for 11.3% of that number.

History
The district was established as Mikoyanovsky District in 1937 within Ostyak–Vogul National Okrug of Omsk Oblast from parts of Beryozovsky and Kondinsky Districts. It was given its present name on November 28, 1957.

References

Notes

Sources

Districts of Khanty-Mansi Autonomous Okrug
States and territories established in 1937
